Mahesh Bhupathi and Leander Paes were the defending champions.  Bhupathi partnered Andrew Florent this year, losing in the second round.  Paes did not participate this year.

Sébastien Lareau and Alex O'Brien won in the final 7–6(7), 7–5, against Paul Haarhuis and Jared Palmer.

Seeds
All seeds receive a bye into the second round.

Draw

Finals

Top half

Bottom half

External links
 1999 Paris Open Doubles draw

1999 Paris Open
1999 ATP Tour